Observatorul de Nord is a newspaper from Soroca, the Republic of Moldova, founded in 1998 by Victor Cobăsneanu.

References

External links 
 Radio Free Europe, „Nici tu ploaie ca lumea, nici tu limpezirea apelor în domeniul politicii”
 Reporter european

Newspapers established in 1998
Romanian-language newspapers published in Moldova
Mass media in Soroca